Jennifer Cristiana Leiva Medrano (born 10 November 1991) is a Nicaraguan football manager and former player who played as a midfielder. She has been a member of the Nicaragua women's national team.

International career
Leiva capped for Nicaragua at senior level during the 2010 CONCACAF Women's World Cup Qualifying qualification and the 2010 Central American and Caribbean Games.

Managerial career
In 2012, Leiva was found to have a brain tumor. She consequently retired from her playing career and by 2013 she was the assistant coach of the Nicaragua women's national team.

References 

1991 births
Living people
Nicaraguan women's footballers
Women's association football midfielders
Nicaragua women's international footballers
Nicaraguan football managers
Women's association football managers
Female association football managers